The Old Rectory is a grade II* listed Victorian moated Rectory, located on the banks of the River Menalhyl in St Columb Major, in Cornwall, England. It is a major work by the architect William White. However, the house is currently neglected and in a severe state of disrepair and suffering from water damage.

Commissioned by Dr Samuel Walker, Rector of St Columb, following speculation that the proposed Cornish bishopric would be based at St Columb. It was built in 1851, on the site of a 14th-century moated medieval house. It is an asymmetrical plan rectory in a Gothic revival style.

Over the years it has undergone a range of alterations. After undergoing several uses in the past it is currently privately owned and unoccupied.

In 2011 it was listed by The Victorian Society as one Britain's most endangered buildings.

After years of inaction by Cornwall Council the Victorian Society launched a petition in 2015 to save the building.
Photos in 2015 show the shocking state of neglect and water damage to the building.

References

Reading list 
Beacham, Peter & Pevsner, Nikolaus (2014) Cornwall. (The Buildings of England.) New Haven: Yale University Press; pp. 523-24
Hals, William, (1740) The Compleat History of Cornwall 
Henderson, Charles (1930) St Columb Major, Church and Parish; p. 9
King, Cathcart & James, David (1983) Castellarium Anglicanum: an Index and Bibliography of the Castles in England, Wales and the Islands. London: Kraus International Publications; Volume I, p. 9
Polsue, Joseph (1867) A Complete Parochial History of the County of Cornwall Truro: William Lake; London: John Camden Hotten, 1867–72, Vol. 1, p. 227
Salter, Mike (1999) The Castles of Devon and Cornwall. Malvern: Folly Publications; p. 35

External links
 Flash Earth - Rectory location map
 Pastscapes
 Cornwall Council Planning history
 Francis Frith Photograph

 

Gothic Revival architecture in Cornwall
Clergy houses in England
Houses completed in 1851
Victorian architecture in England
Grade II listed houses
1851 establishments in England
Grade II* listed buildings in Cornwall
National Heritage List for England
Buildings and structures in Cornwall
St Columb Major